Edwin N. Holmes was the head football coach for the Middlebury College Panthers football team from 1915 to 1917. He compiled a record of 9–11–4.

Head coaching record

References

Year of birth missing
Year of death missing
Middlebury Panthers football coaches